Tim Ostermann (born 16 June 1979) is a German politician of the Christian Democratic Union (CDU) who has served as a member of the Bundestag from the state of North Rhine-Westphalia from 2013 till 2017 and again since 2021.

Political career 
Gohl became a member of the Bundestag in 2021 when he replaced Oliver Wittke who had resigned. In parliament, he has since been serving on the Committee on European Union Affairs.

References

External links 

 Bundestag biography 

1979 births
Living people
Members of the Bundestag for North Rhine-Westphalia
Members of the Bundestag 2017–2021
Members of the Bundestag 2013–2017
Members of the Bundestag for the Christian Democratic Union of Germany